The West Australian Institute of Architects was a professional society for architects in Western Australia.

History

The Institute was originally known as the Institute of West Australian Architects. George Temple-Poole was president in 1896.  Edwin Summerhayes was a founding member.

The Institute subsequently became a state chapter of the Australian Institute of Architects.

Publication 

The Architect was a quarterly publication between 1939 and 2007.

See also
Architecture of Australia

External links 

  WA Chapter of Australian Institute of Architects

References

Architecture organisations based in Australia
Professional associations based in Australia
Architecture-related professional associations
Organisations based in Western Australia